Weird Revolution is the eighth and most recent studio album by the alternative rock band Butthole Surfers, released in 2001 on Surfdog Records and Hollywood Records. It is in large part a rerecorded version of an earlier album, tentatively entitled After the Astronaut, that was abandoned in 1998.

The initial release of this album featured a lenticular cover and jewel case that shows the baby's limbs moving and shooting a beam at other planes on the cover. The song "They Came In" was featured on the soundtrack to Mission: Impossible 2. The song "The Shame of Life" was featured in the trailer for Phone Booth.

Track listing

Singles
"The Shame of Life"
 "The Shame of Life"
 "The Shame of Life" (A Cappella)
 "The Shame of Life" (DJ Z-Trip Remix)
 "The Shame of Life" (Bonus Beats)

"Dracula from Houston"
 "Dracula from Houston (The Bike Song) (Radio Edit)"
 "They Came In"
 "Call Out Hook"

Personnel

Butthole Surfers
Gibby Haynes – vocals
Paul Leary – guitar, producer, mixing (Track 11)
King Coffey – drums

Additional personnel
Rob Cavallo – producer (Tracks 2, 3, 5, 7, 8), A&R
Michael Bradford – engineering (Tracks 1, 2, & 7), additional production (Track 2)
Stuart Sullivan – engineering (Tracks 1, 4–7, & 9–12), mixing (Track 11)
Allen Sides – engineering (Tracks 2, 3, & 8)
Chris Lord-Alge – mixing (Tracks 1–10 & 12)
Brian Gardner – mastering
Nathan Calhoun – bass
Chris Vrenna – additional drum programming (Track 9)
Cheryl Jenets – A&R coordination
Dave Kaplan – management
Actionfigure – art direction, design

References

2001 albums
Butthole Surfers albums
Albums produced by Paul Leary
Surfdog Records albums
Hollywood Records albums
Albums produced by Rob Cavallo